Robin Bonanno (born August 4, 1962 in Nutley, New Jersey) is an American race car driver with extensive experience in a variety of Sports Car and Stock Car sanctioned racing events. Robin was born in New Jersey then later moved to Florida in 1998 where she met Amos Johnson who is a five-time winner of the Rolex 24 At Daytona. Johnson coached Bonanno through her early years behind the wheel, helping her to hone her racing skills.

Robin began racing in 2000 when she joined the Ferrari Club of America and brought her Ferrari to tracks such as Sebring International Raceway, Homestead-Miami Speedway and Moroso Motorsports Park. Robin began her professional racing career with the Sports Car Club of America and over the course of fifteen years has won five SCCA DSR road course championships in the Central Florida region. She has competed in The ARCA Menards Series driving the #10 car for Fast Track Racing. For 2016, she plans to race a 2015 Chevrolet Corvette in the top ranks of the SCCA Pro Racing Trans Am TA3I class.

From 2000 to 2003 Robin also raced a Triumph Spitfire in G Production of the SCCA. Bonanno obtained her racing license in September 2003 through Panoz Racing School at Sebring International Raceway. Robin also made her television debut at the Panoz Racing school during the filming of My Classic Car in September 2003. Later, Robin transferred to the British made Radical in D Sports Racing.

In December 2010, she competed in the Richard Petty Drivers Search III where she competed in several competitions including karts, midgets, short track, stock car, road course stock car, and Dodge Vipers. In addition, Robin ended up finishing in a Sprint Cup car at Charlotte Motor Speedway.

In April 2011, Robin went on to train in stock cars for the ARCA Menards Series, spending many practice hours at Rockingham Motor Speedway and the BMW Performance Driving School.

On May 22, 2011, Robin made her ARCA debut at New Jersey Motorsports Park competing in a road course event. She started 30th and finished, 24th completing the entire 67 lap race.

Throughout Robins career, she had competed in over 100 SCCA sanctioned races including 57 podium finishes and 31 first-place finishes at race tracks including Daytona International Speedway and Sebring International Speedway.

Personal life

At the age of 18 Robin started her first business manufacturing aluminum fly rod cases which sold products all over the world. While running her first business, she became a pilot and for two years enjoyed her passion for flying. After ten years of running her business, Robin sold the aluminum fly rod case company and went on to manage several other businesses. During this time, Robin also became a snow skiing instructor which she greatly enjoyed. After several years of business management, Robin retired to pursue a career in race car driving. Some of Robin's hobbies include bike riding, guitar playing and has even performed several ground-up car restorations. Robin is married to Carl Lunderstadt Sr. Robin and her husband Carl both have been racing instructors for five years teaching for SCCA and The Richard Petty Driving Experience on both road and oval courses.

Championship Titles

SCCA Central Florida Region DSR #282005, 2006, 2007, 2009, 2010
South Atlantic Road Racing Championships, Formula Atlantic #50 2016, 2020 and 2021

Accomplishments
Triumph Spitfire 2000 (Sebring, Florida)ARCA Racing SeriesChevy Stock Car #10, Team Fast Track RacingARCA 2011 Best Finish (NJ) 24thRichard Petty Drivers Search III AlumniRichard Petty Race InstructorSCCA Race Instructor

Affiliates

Center State Bank

Venturist Inc.

Online Commerce Group

Direct Mail Systems

References

External links
 http://www.robinbonannoracing.com
 http://www.onlinecommercegroup.com
 http://www.arcaracing.com/articles/1969264
 http://www.racing-reference.info/driver/Robin_Bonanno
 http://www.myclassiccar.com/episode/05/13/
 http://www.al.com/sports/index.ssf/2010/09/montgomery_driver_wins_her_fif.html
 https://car-restorations.co.uk/

1962 births
American racing drivers
Living people